Lake Killarney may refer to:

Lake Killarney (Illinois)
Lake Killarney (Missouri)
Lake Killarney (Bahamas), New Providence Island
Lakes of Killarney, Ireland